Correbidia simonsi is a moth of the subfamily Arctiinae. It was described by Rothschild in 1912.

References

Arctiinae
Moths described in 1912